Kyrylo Kovalchuk (born 11 June 1986) is a Moldovan-Ukrainian former professional footballer.

Career
Kovalchuk made his debut in the Russian Premier League for FC Tom Tomsk on 19 July 2009 in a game against FC Khimki.

In February 2017, Kovalchuk signed for Kazakhstan Premier League side Ordabasy.

Moldovan Serghei Covalciuc, also a footballer who played for Chornomorets, is his elder brother.

References

External links

Kyrylo Kovalchuk İdmanda‚ kskhaber.com, 23 January 2016

1986 births
Living people
Moldovan footballers
Ukrainian footballers
Ukrainian expatriate footballers
Expatriate footballers in Moldova
Expatriate footballers in Russia
Expatriate footballers in Turkey
FC Zimbru Chișinău players
SC Tavriya Simferopol players
FC Tom Tomsk players
FC Chornomorets Odesa players
Ukrainian Premier League players
Russian Premier League players
Naturalised citizens of Moldova
Ukraine international footballers
FC Metalist Kharkiv players
Karşıyaka S.K. footballers
Ukrainian expatriate sportspeople in Moldova
Ukrainian expatriate sportspeople in Russia
Ukrainian expatriate sportspeople in Turkey
Association football midfielders
FC Ordabasy players
Expatriate footballers in Kazakhstan
Ukrainian expatriate sportspeople in Kazakhstan
Sportspeople from Odesa Oblast